Modruš is a village, former bishopric and current Latin Catholic titular see in the mountainous part of Croatia, located south of its municipality's seat Josipdol (Karlovac County), on the easternmost slopes of Velika Kapela mountain, in northern Lika.
 
The population was 169 in the census of 2011.

History 
One of the counties in the Kingdom of Croatia (in personal union with Hungary) was partially named Modruš-Rijeka County after the town.

From 1193 until 1553 Modruš and the large surrounding estate was owned by members of the Frankopan noble family, who were living in the Tržan castle above the medieval settlement.

Ecclesiastical history 
 During the 1460s, due to the Ottoman (Turkish) advance in Dalmatia, the medieval Catholic Diocese of Corbavia (established in 1185 at Udbina, in Krbava region -hence the name-, including the county of Modruš) was formally suppressed by Pope Pius II, but its territory immediately reassigned to establish as successor see the Diocese of Modruš (Croatian = Curiate Italian) / Modrussa /  (Latin), named after its new see, near Fiume (Rijeka), at the rock fortress of the Frankopan counts (now in the comune Josipdol). Again it was a suffragan of the Metropolitan Archdiocese of Spalato (Split).
 Due to a Croat defeat against the Turks at Udbina in (1493), the episcopal see was again transferred, now to Novi Vinodolski (Italian Novi in Valdivino), south-east of Fiume, but kept Modruš as its title.
 Turkish raids having devastated the nearly-abandoned bishopric since the 1560s, its administration was vested in the nearby Diocese of Segna, and in 1630 Pope Urban VIII united both sees  in personal union, formally remaining separate suffragans of Spalato, as confirmed in 1833 by papal bulla from Gregory XVI. They became known (informally, incorrectly) as the Roman Catholic Diocese of Senj-Modruš.
 By the 19th century, besides the cathedral little survived the Turkish rule, except its Chapter of Canons, divided in three parts residing in the diocese's last parishes : Novi itself, Bribir and Buccari.
 In the first half of the 18th century, Segna and Modruš became suffragans in the ecclesiastical province of the Hungarian Archdiocese of Kalocsa, then from 8 March 1788 suffragans of the Slovenian Archdiocese of Ljubljana, but 19 August 1807 returned to Kalocsa, until 11 December 1852 they became part of the ecclesiastical province of the Croatian Archdiocese of Zagreb.
 On 27 July 1969 by Paul VI's papal bulla 'Coetu intante', Modruš was united with the Diocese of Rijeka–Opatija (Fiume in Italian), which was elevated to Metropolitan archbishopric and renamed Archdiocese of Rijeka–Senj (Fiume-Segna), by privilege bearing the 'additional' title Bishops of Modruš.

Residential Bishops of Modruš 
(all Roman Rite)

Suffragan Bishops of Modruš
 Niccolò di Cattaro (October 1461 – ?)
 Cristoforo da Ragusa (1480.05.29 – death 1498?99)
 Giacomo Dragazio (12 April 1499 – death 1499.09.07)
 Simone de Begno (1509.11.07 – death 1536.03)
 Pierpaolo Vergerio (1536.05.05 – 1536.09.06), previously Apostolic Nuncio (papal ambassador) to Austria-Hungary (1533 – 1535); later Bishop of Koper (Capodistria, Slovenia) (1536.09.06 – retired 1549.07.03), died 1565
 Ermolao Ermolai, Observant Franciscans (O.F.M. Obs.) (1536.11.06 – death 1537)
 Giovanni Evangelista Brachi, Benedictine Order (O.S.B.) (1537.08.17 – death 1537?38)
 Diego de Loaysa, Recollect Augustinians (O.A.R.) (1538.03.11 – resigned 1549)
 Alberto Divini = Gliričić,, Dominican Order (O.P.) (1549.07.26 – 1550.03.19), next Bishop of Krk (Veglia, Croatia) (1550.03.19 – 1564) and Apostolic Administrator of Diocese of Skradin (1550.03.19 – death 1564)
 Lorenzo Gherardi, O.P. (1550.06.20 – ?)
See administrated by Diocese of Veglia (Krk) (?-1560)
 Dionigi Pieppi, O.P. (1560.07.17 – 156?)
 Jovan Kosisić (mentioned in 1564)
 See administrated by Diocese of Segna (Senj)
 From 1630, due to the sees' personal union, see Diocese of Senj (Segna).

Titular see 
The diocese was nominally restored in 2000 as Latin Titular bishopric of Modruš (Croatian = Curiate Italian) / Modrussa /  (Latin).

It has had the following incumbents, so far of the fitting Episcopal (lowest) rank :
 Dominick John Lagonegro (2001.10.30 – ...), as Auxiliary Bishop of Archdiocese of New York (USA) (2001.10.30 – ...).

Notable locals 
 Bernardin Frankopan
 Krsto (Christopher) Frankopan
 Beatrica Frankopan
 Nicholas of Modruš

See also 
 List of Catholic dioceses in Croatia
 Battle of Krbava field
 Urbarium

References

Sources and external links 
 Modruš – a part of the Croatian glagolitic heritage
 GCatholic - former & titular diocese
 History of Modruš
 Historical Diocese of Modruš
 Bibliography - ecclesiastical history 
 Pius Bonifacius Gams, Series episcoporum Ecclesiae Catholicae, Leipzig 1931, pp. 388–389, 399
 Dictionnaire d'Histoire et de Géographie ecclésiastiques, vol. XIII, 1956, coll. 805-806
 K. Draganovic, Croazia sacra, Rome 1943, pp. 197–198
 'Stato della diocesi a fine Ottocento' in Acta Sanctae Sedis, 9 (1876), pp. 292–293
 Bulla 'Apostolici nostri', in Iuris pontificii de propaganda fide, vol. V, pp. 62–64
 Bulla Coetu instante, on vatican.va.
 Konrad Eubel, Hierarchia Catholica Medii Aevi, vol. 1, p. 208; vol. 2, p. 136; vol. 3, p. 247; vol. 4, p. 309

Populated places in Karlovac County
Catholic titular sees in Europe
Former Roman Catholic dioceses in Croatia
Archaeological sites in Croatia
Lika